Xerocomellus pruinatus, commonly known as the matte bolete and formerly known as Boletus pruinatus or Xerocomus pruinatus, is a mushroom in the family Boletaceae native to Europe.

It was transferred to the new genus Xerocomellus described by Czech mycologist Josef Šutara in 2008.

References

Boletaceae
Fungi of Europe
Fungi described in 1835
Taxa named by Elias Magnus Fries